Irish Primary Principals’ Network (IPPN) was established in 2000 and has become the recognised professional body for Ireland’s primary school leaders. With a membership of over 6,000 Principals and Deputy Principals, the IPPN is an independent, not-for-profit, voluntary association, a registered charity, a company limited by guarantee and an officially recognised Education Partner.

References

External links
Irish Primary Principals Network

Education in the Republic of Ireland
2000 establishments in Ireland
Organizations established in 2000